Paraphemone multimaculata is a species of beetle in the family Cerambycidae, and the only species in the genus Paraphemone. It was described by Gressitt in 1935.

References

Pteropliini
Beetles described in 1935